Hinokinin is a dibenzylbutyrolactone lignan, derived from various species of plants. It is a potential antichagonistic agent and has shown to possess neuroprotective effects as well. It is also found to have anti-inflammatory, anti-cancer, antiviral and antifungal properties.

Hinokinin was isolated for the first time by Yoshiki and Ishiguro in 1933 from hinoki wood.

Chemical properties
Hinokinin is a colourless crystalline compound.

It can be isolated from various species of Chamaecyparis, Zanthoxylum, Phyllanthus, Aristolochia, Piper, Virola, Linum and Bursera. It is also synthesised from pinoresinol.

Biological effects

Cytotoxic actions
Hinokinin has shown to induce apoptosis and promote antitumor actions on various cancer cell lines in vitro.

Anti-inflammatory actions
Hinokinin has been shown to inhibit the generation of superoxide molecules by neutrophils and also decreases  elastase secretion from neutrophils. It has also shown to reduce LPS induced nitric oxide production from macrophages.The anti-inflammatory property of hinokinin is mediated by the NF-kB  signalling mechanism.

Anti-parasitic actions
Hinokinin has been shown to be an antitrypanosomal agent. Its use as a treatment for trypanosomiasis is still being researched.

Anti-viral actions
It has shown significant antiviral activity against human hepatitis B virus, HIV and SARS-CoV.

See also
 Cubebin

References

Lignans
Antiviral drugs
Severe acute respiratory syndrome
Anti-inflammatory agents
Antifungals
Benzodioxoles
Lactones